Garcia Live Volume 14 is an album by Jerry Garcia and John Kahn.  It contains the complete concert recorded at The Ritz in Manhattan on January 27, 1986.  It was released as a CD on July 24, 2020, and as a two-disc LP on August 14, 2020.  Some copies of the CD include a bonus disc recorded at the same venue on the following night.

In January and February 1986 Garcia and Kahn, long-time collaborators in the Jerry Garcia Band and other groups, performed a number of concerts as a duo.  Garcia sang and played acoustic guitar and Kahn played double bass.  Another album recorded on this concert tour is Pure Jerry: Marin Veterans Memorial Auditorium, San Rafael, California, February 28, 1986.

Track listing 
Garcia Live Volume 14 – recorded January 27, 1986
First set:
"Deep Elem Blues" (Joe Shelton, Robert Shelton) – 5:37
"Little Sadie" (traditional) – 4:31
"Friend of the Devil" (Jerry Garcia, Robert Hunter, John Dawson) – 6:25
"Oh Babe, It Ain't No Lie" (Elizabeth Cotten) – 5:26
"When I Paint My Masterpiece" (Bob Dylan) – 5:44
"Run for the Roses" (Garcia, Hunter) – 4:33
Second set:
"Dire Wolf" (Garcia Hunter) – 4:27
"Simple Twist of Fate" (Dylan) – 8:26
"Spike Driver Blues" (Mississippi John Hurt) – 4:10
"Bird Song" (Garcia, Hunter) – 9:14
"Ripple" (Garcia, Hunter) – 4:02
Encore:
"Goodnight Irene" (Huddie Ledbetter, John Lomax) – 7:45

Bonus disc – recorded January 28, 1986
First set:
"It Takes a Lot to Laugh, It Takes a Train to Cry" (Dylan) – 6:20
"Dire Wolf" (Garcia, Hunter) – 3:34
"I've Been All Around This World" (traditional) – 5:36
"Spike Driver Blues" (Hurt) – 5:26
"Jack-a-Roe" (traditional) – 4:22
"Run for the Roses" (Garcia, Hunter) – 4:35
Second set:
"Deep Elem Blues" (J. Shelton, R. Shelton) – 7:09
"Oh Babe, It Ain't No Lie" (Cotten) – 5:26
"Little Sadie" (traditional) – 5:32
"Gomorrah" (Garcia, Hunter) – 5:48
"Bird Song" (Garcia, Hunter) – 9:03
"Ripple" (Garcia, Hunter) – 4:10
Encore:
"Goodnight Irene" (Ledbetter, Lomax) – 5:56

Personnel 
Musicians
Jerry Garcia – acoustic guitar, vocals
John Kahn – double bass
Production
Produced by Marc Allan, Kevin Monty
Project Coordination by Lauren Goetzinger
Mastering: Fred Kevorkian
Design, illustration: Ryan Corey
Liner notes essay: Billy Strings
Photos: John Atashian, Robbi Cohn

References 

Jerry Garcia live albums
2020 live albums